The 2014 Pan American Youth Championship was the second edition of the Pan American Youth Championship, an international field hockey competition held from 11 – 15 February 2014 in Montevideo, Uruguay.

The tournament also served as a direct qualifier for the 2014 Summer Youth Olympics, with the winner and runner-up qualifying.

Qualified teams

Results

Pool Stage

Matches

Classification Stage

Semi-finals

Third and fourth place

Final

Statistics

Final standings

Goalscorers

References

Field hockey at the 2014 Summer Youth Olympics
International women's field hockey competitions hosted by Uruguay
Pan American Youth Championship (girls' field hockey)
Pan American Youth Championship (girls' field hockey)